Aber Llwchwr, the estuary of the River Loughor in South Wales, was declared a Site of Special Scientific Interest in Wales (SoDdGA or SSSI) on 1 January 1972 in an attempt to conserve the area. Natural Resources Wales is responsible for the area.

See also
River Loughor

References 

Estuaries of Wales